The National Engineering and Electrical Trade Union (NEETU) was a trade union representing engineering workers in Ireland.

The union was formed in 1920 as the Irish Engineering Industrial Union.  Its first couple of years were turbulent, with the Irish Stationary Engine Drivers and the Operative Society of Mechanical Heating and Domestic Engineers, Whitesmiths, Ironworkers, and Pipe Fitters both joining, but the Irish General Railway and Engineering Union and the Electrical Trades Union both splitting away.

In 1948, the union renamed itself as the Irish Engineering, Industrial and Electrical Trade Union.  The National Engineering Union (a renaming of the Irish General Railway and Engineering Union) amalgamated into the union in 1966, and the union renamed itself as the National Engineering and Electrical Trade Union.  However, the merger was not recognised by the government, and the National Engineering Union continued to exist on paper until 1976.

In 2001, the union merged with the Electrical Trades Union, forming the Technical, Engineering and Electrical Union.

References

Trade unions established in 1920
Trade unions disestablished in 2001
Engineering trade unions
1920 establishments in Ireland
2001 disestablishments in Ireland
Defunct trade unions of Ireland